On the Edge is a Belgian-French-Spanish thriller film directed by  which stars Antonio de la Torre, Marine Vacth, and Olivier Gourmet.

Plot 
Leo is a Spaniard working as a metro driver in Brussels. He is witness to the death of an individual who throw himself into the rails, whom Leo identifies with his son Hugo. Leo embarks on a parallel investigation seeking to understand.

Cast

Production 
A joint co-production among companies from France, Belgium and Spain, the film was produced by Frakas Productions alongside Noodles Productions, Eyeworks and Fasten Films, with the participation of RTVE, Movistar Plus+ and support from ICEC and Eurimages.

Release 
Distributed by Le Pacte, it was set for a 29 June 2022 theatrical release date, whereas distributed by O'Brother Distribution, and Filmax, the film will open in, respectively, Belgian and Spanish theatres on 13 and 14 July 2022.

Reception 
 of Le Figaro wrote that Gederlini "signs an implacable thriller with the excellent Antonio de la Torre".

Raquel Hernández Luján of HobbyConsolas scored 75 out of 100 points ("good"), highlighting the performances, the cinematography, the soundtrack and the handling of the narrative tension as the best things about the film, whereas citing that the film "leaves a lot open to the viewer's interpretation" (with the finale requiring more explanation and development) as the worst feature about it.

Accolades 

|-
| align = "center" | 2023 || 2nd Carmen Awards || Best Actor || Antonio de la Torre ||  || 
|}

See also 
 List of French films of 2022
 List of Spanish films of 2022

References 

Belgian thriller drama films
French thriller drama films
Spanish thriller drama films
2020s French-language films
2020s Spanish-language films
Films set in Brussels
2020s Spanish films
2020s French films